The Manitowoc Breakwater Light is a Lake Michigan lighthouse located near Manitowoc in Manitowoc County, Wisconsin, at the end of the north pier defining Manitowoc's harbor.

It is not to be confused with the smaller and complementary south pier navigational beacon, which was unmoored and swept out into the lake on January 7, 2019, during a period of heavy waves and lakeshore flooding from gusty winds.

Images

References

Further reading 

 Havighurst, Walter (1943) The Long Ships Passing: The Story of the Great Lakes, Macmillan Publishers.
 Oleszewski, Wes, Great Lakes Lighthouses, American and Canadian: A Comprehensive Directory/Guide to Great Lakes Lighthouses, (Gwinn, Michigan: Avery Color Studios, Inc., 1998) .
 Sapulski, Wayne S., (2001) Lighthouses of Lake Michigan: Past and Present (Paperback) (Fowlerville: Wilderness Adventure Books) ; .
 Wright, Larry and Wright, Patricia, Great Lakes Lighthouses Encyclopedia Hardback (Erin: Boston Mills Press, 2006) .

External links
NPS Inventory of Historic Light Stations - Wisconsin

Lighthouses completed in 1918
Houses completed in 1918
Lighthouses in Wisconsin
Buildings and structures in Manitowoc County, Wisconsin
Historic American Engineering Record in Wisconsin
Tourist attractions in Manitowoc County, Wisconsin
1918 establishments in Wisconsin